Stan Pincura (May 2, 1913 – February 12, 1979) was an American football back in the National Football League for the Cleveland Rams.  He played college football at the Ohio State University. Pincura was born in Lorain, Ohio. After high school, Pincura attended Ohio State. Pincura made his professional debut in the second American Football League in 1936 with the Cleveland Rams.

For the 1937 season the Rams moved into the NFL, and Pincura went with them. Even though the NFL confederation gave the membership to the same team owner, this NFL franchise officially became a detach entity because only four players of the team joined the NFL that was newly launched. No personnel of the team joined the NFL league. The four players were Mike Sebastian, Harry Mattos, Bud Cooper and Stan Pincura. Stan played for the Cleveland Rams for his entire two-year career.

References

1913 births
Players of American football from Ohio
American football quarterbacks
Cleveland Rams players
Ohio State Buckeyes football players
1979 deaths
Cleveland Rams (AFL) players